Catchpenny print (Dutch centsprent) is the name given to a type of cheap, mass-produced sheets printed on one side and illustrated with simple images, that were sold in the Netherlands in the eighteenth and nineteenth centuries.

The catchpenny prints can be regarded as source material for research of text and language; of the daily life of our ancestors plying trades (that have disappeared), children's games, transport, fashion, role patterns, housing and housekeeping; tilling the land, poverty and wealth; of values and standards and pedagogical views and of image with illustration techniques and styles.

Image Gallery

See also 

 Épinal print

References 

 Karin Vingerhoets, "Catchpenny prints in The Netherlands", Europeana blog.

External links 

 1280 catchpenny prints from the Koninklijke Bibliotheek at the Hague
 Catchpennyprint collection at the Erfgoedbibliotheek Hendrik Conscience
 Catchpenny prints at the Stichting Geschiedenis Kinder- en Jeugdliteratuur
Background on catchpenny prints on the Koniklijke Bibliotheek website (in Dutch)

Printmaking
Dutch culture